Ināra Mūrniece (born 30 December 1970) is a Latvian journalist, politician and a member of Saeima. She was Speaker of the Saeima from 2014 to 2022. In 2022 she was succeeded in that role by Edvards Smiltēns.

Early life and professional career
In 2007, she graduated from the School of Economics and Culture and in 2009, graduated from the University of Latvia. She worked as a journalist for the newspaper Latvijas Avīze, stopped working there in August 2011.

Elected office and public life
In 2011, Mūrniece ran in the 11th Saeima elections from the list of the National Aliance and was elected to the Saeima. She worked in the Saeima as the Chairperson of the Human Rights and Public Affairs Commission. In 2014, she was elected to the 12th Saeima and became the Speaker of the Saeima, and retained the position as Speaker throughout the 12th term of the Saeima.

She was elected to the 13th Saeima in the autumn of 2018. For the second term in a row, Mūrniece was elected Speaker of the Saeima, against Dagmāra Beitnere-Le Galla. Also, in next election in October 2022, she was reelected to 14th Saeima.

Defence minister
On 14 December 2022, Mūrniece became Minister of Defence of Latvia.

Personal life
She was married to historian and politician Ritvars Jansons, who was a member of the 12th Saeima. They have one daughter. They divorced in 2015.

References

1970 births
Living people
All for Latvia! politicians
National Alliance (Latvia) politicians
Speakers of the Saeima
Deputies of the 11th Saeima
Deputies of the 12th Saeima
Deputies of the 13th Saeima
Deputies of the 14th Saeima
Women deputies of the Saeima
21st-century Latvian women politicians
Women legislative speakers
Female defence ministers
Ministers of Defence of Latvia